The 1993 Bandy World Championship was contested between eight men's bandy playing nations. Russia made its debut, replacing the former Soviet Union. The championship was played in Norway, mostly in Vikingskipet Olympic Arena, from 2 February – 7 February 1993. Sweden became champions. The group stages were played with 30 minute halves whereas the final tour games were played with 45 minute halves.

Squads

Group A

Premier tour
 2 February
Sweden – Norway   6 – 1
Russia – Finland  1 – 0
 3 February
Finland – Sweden  1 – 10
Russia – Norway   2 – 0
 4 February
Norway – Finland  1 – 4
Russia – Sweden   1 – 2

Group B

Premier tour
 3 February
USA – Canada	        8 – 0
Hungary – Netherlands  3 – 0
Canada – Netherlands   4 – 1
USA – Hungary          4 – 0
 4 February
USA – Netherlands      9 – 1
Canada – Hungary	4 – 1

Final Tour

Quarter-finals
 5 February
Norway – USA          7 – 0

Semifinals
 6 February
 Russia – Finland     8 – 5
 Sweden – Norway      6 – 3

Match for 7th place
 6 February
Hungary – Netherlands 6 – 4

Match for 5th place
 6 February
USA – Canada          5 – 3

Match for 3rd place
 7 February
Finland – Norway      3 – 5

Final
 7 February
 Sweden – Russia      8 – 0

References

1993
World Championship
Bandy World Championship
International bandy competitions hosted by Norway
Bandy World Championship